Al Salibikhaet Stadium is a multi-use stadium in Sulaibikhat, Kuwait.  It is currently used mostly for football matches and is the home stadium of Al Salibikhaet.  The stadium holds 7,000 people.

References

External links
Stadium information

Football venues in Kuwait